Yes I Am is the debut studio album by Australian recording artist Jack Vidgen, who was also the winner of the fifth season of Australia's Got Talent. It was released through Sony Music Australia on 19 August 2011.

Track listing

Charts and certification

Weekly charts

Year-end charts

Certification

References

2011 debut albums
Jack Vidgen albums
Sony Music Australia albums